The 1996–97 Miami Redskins men's basketball team represent Miami University in the 1996–97 NCAA Division I men's basketball season. The Redskins, led by first year head coach Charlie Coles, played their home games at Millett Hall in Oxford, Ohio as members of the Mid-American Conference. The team finished atop the conference regular season standings, won the MAC tournament, and earned an automatic bid to the NCAA tournament. As the No. 13 seed in the Midwest region, Miami was defeated by Clemson in the opening round. The Redskins finished with a 21–9 record (15–3 MAC).

This was the final season Miami was known as the Redskins. The following season the team would change to the RedHawks.

Roster

Schedule and results

|-
!colspan=9 style=| Regular season

|-
!colspan=9 style=| MAC tournament

|-
!colspan=9 style=| NCAA tournament

Source

Rankings

References

Miami RedHawks men's basketball seasons
Miami (OH)
Miami (OH)